Rajewadi railway station is a small station in the Pune district of Maharashtra, India. Its code is RJW. It serves Rajewadi, on the Pune–Bangalore railway line which can serve as connection to proposed Chhatrapati Sambhaji Raje International Airport. An approach road will be constructed to the airport from the city but the decision for connection with rapid transit systems is yet to be finalized.

The station has a single platform and lacks basic facilities such as water and sanitation.

Trains serving the station

 Pune Satara Passenger
 Kolhapur–Pune Passenger

References

Railway stations in Pune
Pune railway division
Railway stations in Pune district